We Are All Together is an Iranian comedy film directed by Kamal Tabrizi. The film is also the first joint co-operation between Mohammad Reza Golzar, Leila Hatami, Mehran Ghafourian, Pejman Jamshidi and Sirus Gorjestani.

Plot 

The film tells the story in a comedy setting and tells the story of an airline that is going bankrupt.

Cast

References

External links 
 

2019 films
Iranian comedy films
Persian-language films
2019 comedy films
Films set on airplanes
Films directed by Kamal Tabrizi